Santi Francesi is an Italian musical duo who won the sixteenth season of the Italian version of the X Factor.

History 
Previously known as The Jab, they participated at the 17th season of the Italian talent show Amici di Maria De Filippi. They released a studio album in 2019 and various singles between 2018 and 2021. In June 2021, the band won the 32nd edition of Musicultura. Their single "Giovani favolosi" was included in the soundtrack of the season 3 of the Netflix series Summertime.

They participated as contestants at the sixteenth edition of the Italian version of X Factor, and were mentored by coach Rkomi. On 8 December 2022, they won the competition with their single "Non è così male". On 12 December 2022, the band released the extended play In fieri, which include their winning single, two cover songs performed during X Factor, and three original songs.

Discography

Studio albums
Tutti manifesti (2019)

EPs
In fieri (2022)

Singles
"Elena" (2018) 
"Costenzo" (2018) 
"Vaniglia" (2018) 
"Lei" (2019) 
"Bianca" (2019) 
"Giovani favolosi" (2021) 
"Signorino" (2022)
"Buttami giù" (2022)
"Non è così male" (2022)

References

Italian musical duos
Italian pop music groups
The X Factor winners
X Factor (Italian TV series) contestants